is a 1963 Japanese drama film directed by Noboru Nakamura and the first adaptation of the novel The Old Capital (1962) by Nobel prize-winning Japanese writer Yasunari Kawabata. The film was nominated for the Academy Award for Best Foreign Language Film.

Plot
20-year-old Chieko is the daughter of Kyoto based kimono designer Takichiro. She doubts her parents' story that they stole her as a child and raised her as their own, convinced that she is an orphan. In Kitayama, she meets a young labourer woman, Naeko, who looks exactly like her. Chieko learns that they are twin sisters, and that their natural parents died long ago after abandoning Chieko. Hideo, the son of weaver Sosuke, a business associate of Takichiro, mistakes Naeko for Chieko and pleads with her to allow him to design an exclusive obi for her. Chieko clarifies Hideo's mistaking and asks him to make obis both for her and her sister. Although Chieko's parents offer to accept Naeko as their second daughter, Naeko returns to her home village after spending one night at her twin sister's home. While Chieko plans to take over her father's business with the help of her future husband Ryusuke, Naeko considers marrying Hideo, even when she knows that for Hideo she is mainly a surrogate for Chieko.

Cast
 Shima Iwashita as Chieko / Naeko
 Hiroyuki Nagato as Hideo Otomo
 Seiji Miyaguchi as Takichiro Sada
 Teruo Yoshida as Ryusuke Mizuki
 Tamotsu Hayakawa as Shinichi Mizuki
 Eijirō Tōno as Sosuke Otomo
 Yoshiko Nakamura as Shige
 Michiyo Tamaki as Masako
 Chieko Naniwa as madam

Awards and legacy
Twin Sisters of Kyoto received the Mainichi Film Concours for Best Supporting Actor (Hiroyuki Nagato) and Best Cinematography (Tōichirō Narushima).

Kawabata's novel was adapted again as Koto by Kon Ichikawa in 1980 and by Yuki Saito in 2016.

See also
 List of submissions to the 36th Academy Awards for Best Foreign Language Film
 List of Japanese submissions for the Academy Award for Best Foreign Language Film

References

External links

1963 films
1963 drama films
Films based on Japanese novels
Films based on works by Yasunari Kawabata
Films directed by Noboru Nakamura
Japanese drama films
Twins in fiction
Films about twin sisters
1960s Japanese films
1960s Japanese-language films